Donald Shaw (born 1951) is a retired American volleyball coach and player. 

Over a combined 27 years, he coached for the men and women's volleyball teams at Stanford, winning NCAA titles with the women's team four times: in 1992, 1994, 1996, and 1997. Shaw was inducted into the Stanford Athletics Hall of Fame in 2011.

Shaw is considered to be one of the most successful volleyball coaches in NCAA history, and his .863 winning percentage is the best in NCAA women's collegiate volleyball history.

Personal life
Shaw is from Pacific Palisades, California and he graduated from Palisades High School. In high school, he excelled in baseball and basketball, was a member of the 1969 LA City Basketball Champions and was selected by the Kansas City Royals in the 1969 Major League Baseball draft. Shaw played basketball Santa Monica College from 1969-71 (where he was All-Conference both years and 1970-71 SMC Athlete of the Year) and at Loyola Marymount at the forward position from 1971-73, and led the West Coast Athletic Conference in free throw percentage (85.3) in 1971-72. Shaw continued his basketball career playing in Europe and South America from 1973-74.

Don Shaw was married to Carolyn Walker Shaw from 1988-2001. He received a bachelor's degree in sociology with an athletic coaching minor from UC Santa Barbara in 1977. 

Shaw has two children, both of whom went on to have successful volleyball careers. His son, James Shaw, is a member of the United States men's national volleyball team and played volleyball at Stanford, where he was an AVCA First Team All-American. His daughter, Jordan Shaw, played volleyball for the USA A2 Junior National Team that won gold at the 2011 European Global Challenge and collegiately for St. Mary's, where she earned honorable mention All-America honors.

Playing career

Shaw was a member of the indoor U.S. National Team in 1979 and played professionally for the San Jose Diablos in 1979 and 1980. 

Shaw also played beach volleyball, notably with fellow Hall of Fame player Karch Kiraly. They placed third in the ‘78 World Championship volleyball tournament. Shaw earned the highest beach rating possible (AAA) and competed in the World Beach Championships.

Coaching career
After beginning his career as an assistant coach at UC Santa Barbara, Shaw began his Stanford coaching career in 1980 when he was an assistant on both the men and women's teams until 1983, under Fred Sturm. He head coached both the men’s and women’s teams at Stanford for a combined 27 years starting in 1984. In 1984 and 1985, he was the co-head coach with Sturm for both programs before becoming the solo head coach for the women's team from 1986 to 1999. Shaw took a leave of absence in 2000 and in 2001, he announced that he was leaving the women's program to take over the men's team for the second time, a position he would hold until retiring from collegiate coaching in 2006. 

Shaw is regarded as one of the best NCAA volleyball coaches of all time as he shaped the Stanford women's team into a national powerhouse. Shaw led the team to its first NCAA championship in 1992 and through present-day, Stanford is the record holder for most NCAA championships amongst Division I programs (9).

Stanford (women)

Shaw was the co-head coach with Sturm in the 1984 and 1985 seasons with the women's volleyball team, before being the sole head coach beginning in 1986. In his sixteen seasons with the Stanford women's volleyball team, Shaw had a record of 440-70. He led Stanford to the NCAA Championship match eight times, winning the NCAA national championships in 1992, 1994, 1996, and 1996. In addition to four NCAA titles, he also led Stanford to 10 conference titles, including six Pac-10 Championships in a row from 1994-1999. 

Seven of his Stanford players have earned AVCA National Player of the Year honors, including Kim Oden Bev Oden, Kristin Klein, Cary Wendell and Kerri Walsh.

Stanford (men)

Shaw was the co-head coach with Sturm in the 1984 and 1985 seasons with the men's volleyball team and returned to coach from 2002-2006. Throughout all seasons, he holds a record of 122–128.

Notable men's players that Shaw coached at Stanford was ‘88 Gold Medalist Scott Fortune who was the captain of the 1992 men's Olympic team, ‘88 Gold Medalist Jon Root and ‘08 Gold Medalist Kevin Hansen.

Other coaching works

Shaw served as an assistant coach for the gold medal-winning United States Men's Team at the 1982 National Sports Festival as well as the assistant for the U.S. Women's Team at the 1991 Pan American Games in Havana, Cuba.

Head coaching record

External links
Beach Volleyball Database profile

References 

1951 births
American volleyball coaches
American men's volleyball players
American men's beach volleyball players
Living people
People from Pacific Palisades, California
Stanford Cardinal men's volleyball coaches
Stanford Cardinal women's volleyball coaches
Loyola Marymount Lions men's basketball players
Baseball players from Los Angeles
University of California, Santa Barbara alumni